Hrudayam Ekkadunnadi  is a 2014 Indian Telugu-language romantic drama film directed by Vi Anand and starring Krishna Madhav, Anusha and Samskruthy Shenoy. The title of the film is based on a song from Ghajini (2005).

Cast 
Krishna Madhav as Madhav 
Anusha as Divya
Samskruthy Shenoy as Nitya
Dhanraj

Production 
This marks the directorial debut of Vi Anand, an assistant of A. R. Murugadoss. Krishna Madhav, a relative of Jay Galla, makes his acting debut with this film. He worked as an assistant director for Khaleja (2010) and Dookudu (2011). Samskruthy Shenoy also made her debut with this film although Black Butterfly (2013) released first.

Soundtrack 
The music for the film was composed by Vishal Chandrasekhar and was well received. A critic rated the film's soundtrack three out of five.
"Shajahan Tajaina" - Ranjith
"Gayathri" -  Vijay Prakash
"Manasu Ante Inthena" 
"Edo Edo Chilipikala" 
"Aey Chittamma"

Reception 
A critic from The Times of India wrote that "As a subject, the film has hardly shown that it can interest an audience. The pace of the movie is also painfully slow". A critic from 123telugu wrote that "Hrudayam Ekkadunnadhi is the kind of film any newcomer would like to forget about".

References